Marian Spoida (4 January 1901 - 16 April 1940) was a Polish soccer-player and later a coach. Born on 4 January 1901 in Poznań, he was executed by the Soviet secret services at Lvov on 16 April 1940, aged 39.

Spoida in the 1920s represented both Warta Poznań and the Polish National Team. Later, he became a trainer and together with Józef Kałuża, went to Strasbourg, France, to coach Poland in its FIFA World Cup 1938 5-6 game vs. Brazil (5 June 1938).

See also
Polish Roster in World Cup Soccer France 1938

References

External links

1901 births
1940 deaths
Footballers from Poznań
Greater Poland Uprising (1918–1919) participants
Polish people of the Polish–Soviet War
Polish footballers
Poland international footballers
Olympic footballers of Poland
Footballers at the 1924 Summer Olympics
Warta Poznań players
Warta Poznań managers
Executed people from Greater Poland Voivodeship
Association football midfielders
Polish military personnel killed in World War II